Salmawaih ibn Bunan (died 840) was an Assyrian Nestorian Christian physician who translated works of Galen from Greek into Arabic. He flourished at the time of the Abbasid caliphs al-Ma'mun and al-Mu'tasim, serving as private physician to the latter. It is reported that al-Mu'tasim trusted Salmawaih to such an extent that he called him "father", and that he prayed in person over Salmawaih's grave when he died.

He was a patron of the fellow Nestorian physician and translator Hunayn ibn Ishaq, helping him in his translation of Galen's On The Therapeutic Method. His scientific work included studies on the harmful effects of aphrodisiacs. He was a rival of the fellow Nestorian physician Ibn Masawayh.

References

Sources
 
 

840 deaths
9th-century people from the Abbasid Caliphate
9th-century physicians
Greek–Arabic translators
Medieval Assyrian physicians
Year of birth unknown
Nestorians in the Abbasid Caliphate
9th-century people